Pentwater is a village in Oceana County in the U.S. state of Michigan. The population was 857 at the 2010 census. The village is located within Pentwater Township. Pentwater is home to Mears State Park. The name Pentwater comes from Pent or Penned up waters. The entrance to the channel is notoriously shallow and for many years dictated the size of vessels that the village was able to accommodate.

Geography
Pentwater is the biggest community in Oceana County due to the community's area.

Transportation
 passes east of the village and runs south toward Muskegon and north toward Ludington.
 is a business loop through downtown Pentwater.
 is a County-Designated Highway running southerly from Pentwater, closer to (but generally not within sight of) Lake Michigan.

Eight streets within the village: Hancock, Carroll, Wythe, Rutledge, Rush, Ellery, Morris, and Clymer, are named after signers of the Declaration of Independence.

Demographics

2010 census
As of the census of 2010, there were 857 people, 450 households, and 269 families residing in the village. The racial makeup of the village was 97.3% White, 0.1% African American, 0.2% Native American, 0.9% from other races, and 1.4% from two or more races. Hispanic or Latino of any race were 2.5% of the population.

There were 450 households, of which 13.1% had children under the age of 18 living with them, 50.0% were married couples living together, 7.8% had a female householder with no husband present, 2.0% had a male householder with no wife present, and 40.2% were non-families. 36.0% of all households were made up of individuals, and 19.7% had someone living alone who was 65 years of age or older. The average household size was 1.89 and the average family size was 2.38.

The median age in the village was 60.3 years. 11.2% of residents were under the age of 18; 4.3% were between the ages of 18 and 24; 10.1% were from 25 to 44; 36.2% were from 45 to 64; and 38.3% were 65 years of age or older. The gender makeup of the village was 45.5% male and 54.5% female.

2000 census
As of the census of 2000, there were 958 people, 463 households, and 301 families residing in the village. The racial makeup of the village was 97.60% White, 0.21% African American, 0.31% Native American, 0.42% Asian, 0.10% Pacific Islander, 0.63% from other races, and 0.73% from two or more races. Hispanic or Latino of any race were 1.15% of the population.

There were 463 households, out of which 17.7% had children under the age of 18 living with them, 54.4% were married couples living together, 8.0% had a female householder with no husband present, and 34.8% were non-families. 31.3% of all households were made up of individuals, and 14.9% had someone living alone who was 65 years of age or older.  The average household size was 2.06 and the average family size was 2.51.

In the village, the population was spread out, with 15.8% under the age of 18, 5.4% from 18 to 24, 15.1% from 25 to 44, 33.6% from 45 to 64, and 30.1% who were 65 years of age or older.  The median age was 53 years. For every 100 females, there were 89.0 males.  For every 100 females age 18 and over, there were 86.4 males.

The median income for a household in the village was $38,542, and the median income for a family was $45,909. Males had a median income of $40,750 versus $25,833 for females. The per capita income for the village was $22,783.  About 6.6% of families and 8.4% of the population were below the poverty line, including 17.1% of those under age 18 and 2.7% of those age 65 or over.

Local events
Pentwater's specialty is its location to Lake Michigan.  The area is a tourist mecca in the summer, frequently visited by Chicagoans looking to get away.  Pentwater has a number of bed and breakfasts, in addition to the more traditional motels. Sportfishing is popular in the area, as is shopping. The village has a number of art galleries. Nearby Charles Mears State Park is a popular location during the summer months as well.  The village hosts a juried art fair mid-July.  Memorial Day in Pentwater is considered the beginning of the summer season, and there is a popular annual fishing contest.

Pentwater is home to several bands, which play concerts Thursday nights during the summer, beginning in late June, in the outdoor bandshell at the village green, a park and natural amphitheatre located downtown on the shore of Pentwater Lake.

Pentwater holds an annual Homecoming, which is usually the week of second Thursday of August.  Homecoming festivities include a parade, fireworks, and sandcastle-building contest.

Notable people
Charles Mears, businessman and developer
Adolph Walter Rich, founder of the Jewish agricultural colony at Arpin, Wisconsin

References

External links

Pentwater Chamber of Commerce
Pentwater Michigan Lake, Fun and Sun
Pentwater Historical Society
Pentwater Michigan Vacation and Village Information
Oceana Herald Journal Newspaper
Pentwater Cottage Rentals

Villages in Oceana County, Michigan
Villages in Michigan